Hugh "Chuck" Hind (died 28 January 1977) was a former SAS soldier who allegedly assassinated the Chairman of ZANU, Herbert Chitepo.

Hind served with the British SAS during the 1960s. He was awarded the Queen's Commendation for Brave Conduct for rescuing a young child from the River Wye in Hereford. Hind jumped into the water when it was flooded with heavy rains, he reviving the rescued child with mouth-to-mouth resuscitation.

Hind emigrated to Rhodesia and, working with another Rhodesian Central Intelligence Organisation operative, known only as "Taffy" Brice, they performed a series of raids into Zambia, against ZANU and ZAPU targets during the Rhodesian Bush War. Taffy and Hind were assisted in Zambia by a white Zambian farmer, Ian Robert Bruce Sutherland.

Herbert Chitepo was assassinated on 17 March 1975 in Lusaka, Zambia, allegedly by Hind and Brice. They are said to have placed a car bomb in his Volkswagen Beetle. The explosion sent part of the car onto the roof of his house and uprooted a tree next door.

Hind died in a motor vehicle collision in January 1977. While transporting weapons near Lusaka, the vehicle skidded and left the road; Sutherland was also in the car at the time, but survived.

Zambian police raided Sutherland's farm in Mazabuka on 22 November 1978, after which he was tried and convicted of illegally possessing offensive material, and sentenced to 4 years' imprisonment.

References

Sources

1977 deaths
British emigrants to Rhodesia
Foreign volunteers in the Rhodesian Security Forces
People from Mazabuka District
Rhodesian military personnel of the Bush War
Rhodesian Special Air Service personnel
Road incident deaths in Zambia
Special Air Service soldiers
White Rhodesian people
Year of birth missing
Recipients of the Queen's Commendation for Brave Conduct